Al-Mamlaka (literally "The Kingdom") is a Jordan-based public broadcaster based in Amman, Jordan, established by a 2015 bylaw. It was launched on 16 July 2018. The TV channel is state-funded and offers public broadcasting services – it is neither state-owned nor commercial.

History
Established in 2015 by the Independent Media bylaw, Al-Mamlaka's members of the board of directors were appointed by a Royal Decree on 10 July 2015. A $14 million annual budget was allocated to the channel. Al Ghad's columnist Fahed Khitan was named as chairman, with Marwan Jumaa, Nart Buran, Ayman Safadi, and Bassim Tweisi as board members.

The channel replaces previous government plans to introduce a third channel for the Jordan TV. Jordanian officials stated the Al-Mamlaka will be independent from the Jordan TV, offering public broadcasting services – making it neither state-owned nor commercial.

A statement by the channel on 30 June 2018 claimed that "Jordanians are expected to witness an advanced and qualitative leap with more freedom and professionalism", compared with other Jordanian channels.

The channel was officially launched on 16 July 2018.

References

External links

2018 establishments in Jordan
Arabic-language television stations
Television channels and stations established in 2018
Television channels in Jordan